Kärt Tammjärv (born 11 June 1991) is an Estonian actress.

In 2014 she graduated from the Estonian Academy of Music and Theatre.

Since 2014 she is an actress at the Vanemuine Theater.

Stage productions
2014 Avtandil Varsimašvili "Love! Love! Love!" (Cow, River, Butterflies, Sheep)
2014 Jacob Grimm/Veikko Täär "Red Riding Hood" (Red Riding Hood)
2015 A. H. Tammsaare/Urmas Lennuk "Our Own Truth, In Our Own Right" (Krõõt)

References

External links
Kärt Tammjärv "Vanemuise" theater website
Kärt Tammjärv Estonian Actors Union website

1991 births
Estonian stage actresses
Estonian film actresses
Estonian television actresses
Actresses from Tallinn
Estonian Academy of Music and Theatre alumni
Living people
21st-century Estonian actresses